Costa Caribe is a Nicaraguan professional basketball team that competes in Nicaragua's Torneo Carlos Ulloa league.

They have played in the Liga Centroamericana de clubes de baloncesto, where they reached the Final Four in the 2016 edition.

Costa Caribe has traditionally provided Nicaragua's national basketball team with key players.

Notable players
- Set a club record or won an individual award as a professional player.
- Played at least one official international match for his senior national team at any time.
  Dalton Cacho
  Dayton Cacho
  Jensen Campbell
  Noel McKenzie
  Denzel Moody

References

External links
Presentation at Latinbasket.com

 Basketball teams in Nicaragua
 Sport in Managua